The German Meteor expedition (German: Deutsche Atlantik Expedition) was an oceanographic expedition that explored the South Atlantic ocean from the equatorial region to Antarctica in 1925–1927. Depth soundings, water temperature studies, water samples, studies of marine life and atmospheric observations were conducted.

Expedition

The survey vessel  left Wilhelmshaven on 16 April 1925 with the oceanographer Alfred Merz in charge of the expedition.

The ship zigzagged between Africa and South America and took echo soundings of the South Atlantic between 20° North and 60° South. In January 1926 the Strait of Magellan was transited; in March the same year a seamount was found and named Meteor Bank.

In June 1926 Merz, who already had health problems before the start of the expedition, was hospitalised at the German Hospital in Buenos Aires. He died of pneumonia on 25 August 1926. The overall lead of the expedition was assumed by the ship's captain Fritz Spieß, while Georg Wüst became chief oceanographer.

The expedition returned to Wilhelmshaven on 2 June 1927.

Results

Meteor was equipped with early sonar equipment with which it produced the first detailed survey of the south Atlantic Ocean floor. The survey established that  the mid-Atlantic ridge was continuous through the South Atlantic and continued into the Indian Ocean beyond the Cape of Good Hope.

References

Sources

External links

Images at NOAA

Oceanographic expeditions
Atlantic expeditions
Expeditions from Germany
1920s in Antarctica
1920s in science